The Church of Our Lady of the Mount Carmel, popularly known as Iglesia de la Aguada, is a Roman Catholic parish church in Montevideo, Uruguay.

Overview
Originally there was a small church where, in 1829, the First Constituent Assembly was summoned.

The present temple was built in 1861 and, later, in 1930, the facade was adapted to the new street.

The parish was established 8 September 1866. 

The church is dedicated to Our Lady of Mount Carmel, a very popular devotion of the Virgin Mary.

Same devotion
There are other churches in Uruguay dedicated to Our Lady of the Mount Carmel:
 Church of Our Lady of Mt. Carmel
 Church of Our Lady of Mt. Carmel (Cordón)
 Church of Our Lady of Mt. Carmel and St. Saint Thérèse of Lisieux (Prado)
 Church of Our Lady of Mt. Carmel and St. Cajetan
 Church of Our Lady of Mt. Carmel in Migues
 Church of Our Lady of Mt. Carmel in Toledo
 Church of Our Lady of Mt. Carmel in Capilla del Sauce
 Church of Our Lady of Mt. Carmel in Durazno
 Church of Our Lady of Mt. Carmel in Villa del Carmen
 Church of Our Lady of Mt. Carmel in Melo
 Church of Our Lady of Mt. Carmel in San Gregorio de Polanco
 Church of Our Lady of Mt. Carmel in Solís de Mataojo
 Church of Our Lady of Mt. Carmel in Carmelo
 Church of Our Lady of Mt. Carmel in Salto

References

External links

Aguada, Montevideo
1866 establishments in Uruguay
Roman Catholic church buildings in Montevideo
Our Lady of Mount Carmel
Roman Catholic churches completed in 1891
20th-century Roman Catholic church buildings in Uruguay